The Rye Brook Open was a Grand Prix affiliated men's tennis tournament held in Rye Brook, New York. It was held twice: once in 1987 and once in 1988 and both were held on outdoor hard courts.

Results

Singles

Doubles

External links
ATP Tour Website

 
Defunct tennis tournaments in the United States
Hard court tennis tournaments
Grand Prix tennis circuit
Tennis tournaments in New York (state)